Cape Hoppner  is a land point on Melville Island, Northwest Territories, Canada. It juts into the southern section of Liddon Gulf across from Barry Bay.

The cape was named in honor of the Royal Navy officer and Arctic explorer Henry Parkyns Hoppner.

References

 The Atlas of Canada

External links
 1856 Chart of Arctic Sea: Melville Sound

Landforms of the Northwest Territories